The Protestant Redemption Church, also named the Redemption Temple (Temple de la Rédemption) or simply La Rédemption, is a Lutheran parish in the 9th arrondissement of Paris, France. It is affiliated with the United Protestant Church of France.

History
The church was established in a former 90-meter-long unloading hall built between 1821 and 1825 by architect Louis-Adrien Lusson.

In 1837, Protestant Princess Helene of Mecklenburg-Schwerin married King Louis Philippe I's son Ferdinand Philippe at the Redemption Church. She was a co-founder of the church which she attended regularly. Between 1841 and 1843, German architect Franz Christian Gau made extensive alterations to the building while keeping its four bays. After Gau's death, the works were ended by Théodore Ballu.

In 1873, Paul Gauguin married a young Dane, Mette-Sophie Gad (1850–1920), at the Redemption Temple. The funeral of Baron Georges-Eugène Haussmann took place on January 15, 1891, in the church. Haussmann was a regular parishioner of the Redemption Church.

The building was listed as a Historic Monument on February 21, 1958.

The temple has an organ.

See also
 List of churches in Paris
 Protestantism in Paris
 Protestantism in France
 United Protestant Church of France

References

Bibliography

External links 

 
 Protestant Redemption Church, Paris Museums Collections 

Lutheran churches in France
Protestant churches in Paris
Buildings and structures in the 9th arrondissement of Paris
Churches completed in 1843
Monuments historiques of Paris